Acyline (developmental code name MER-104) is a gonadotropin-releasing hormone analogue (GnRH analogue) and gonadotropin-releasing hormone antagonist (GnRH antagonist) which was never marketed. It has been shown to suppress gonadotropin and testosterone levels in men. Acyline is a peptide and under normal circumstances is not orally active. For this reason, it has instead been administered by subcutaneous injection.

See also
 Gonadotropin-releasing hormone receptor § Antagonists

References

Abandoned drugs
GnRH antagonists
Peptides